Godley & Creme were an English rock duo formally established in Manchester in 1977 by Kevin Godley and Lol Creme. The pair began releasing music as a duo after their departure from the rock band 10cc. In 1979, they directed their first music video with the single "An Englishman in New York".  After this, they became involved in the production of videos for artists such as Ultravox, the Police, Yes, Duran Duran, Frankie Goes to Hollywood and Wang Chung, as well as directing the groundbreaking video for their 1985 single "Cry". The duo split at the end of the 1980s. Both have since been involved in music videos, TV commercials, and sporadic music projects.

History

Early years and 10cc
Kevin Godley and Lol Creme met in the late 1950s and for a brief time were in an amateur band together. Early 60s they joined white R&B combo The Sabres (The Magic Lanterns) together. Though they played in different bands, with Godley briefly in The Mockingbirds with Graham Gouldman, who would later work with Godley and Creme in 10cc.

After recording a one-off single under the name of 'Yellow Bellow Room Boom' for UK CBS in 1967 ("Seeing Things Green" b/w "Still Life"), the pair began their professional music career together in 1969, performing pop music in Strawberry Studios at Stockport near Manchester with Eric Stewart and Graham Gouldman (often mistakenly referred to as being "Bubblegum Music", perhaps because they were contracted by Kasenetz & Katz, who produced bubblegum sub-teen pop in the US on the Buddah label). The duo also released a single in 1969, "I'm Beside Myself" b/w "Animal Song", under the name Frabjoy & Runcible Spoon after being signed on to Marmalade Records directly by label head Giorgio Gomelsky. A 7-song LP was slated for a late 1969 release on Marmalade; however, the label collapsed under the weight of its financial situation before the end of the year, and the LP was shelved until its release in the 2022 compilation Frabjous Days: The Secret World of Godley & Creme 1967–1969 on Grapefruit Records.

Joined by Eric Stewart to form Hotlegs they first secured a chart success with the song "Neanderthal Man" which hit #2 in the UK. The band, after serving as the backing band for two successful Neil Sedaka albums, evolved into 10cc in 1972 when Graham Gouldman joined. 10cc went on to record four albums and enjoyed chart success, most notably with their 1975 single "I'm Not in Love", a hit on both sides of the Atlantic.

10cc split and later years
After the release of 10cc's fourth LP, How Dare You! (1976), Godley and Creme left the band to perfect a device they dubbed "The Gizmo" (Gizmotron), a module which attached to the bridge of an electric guitar. The Gizmo used small motor-driven rotating wheels which were pressed into contact with the strings, thus creating a continuous, violin-like "bowing" effect on all or any combination of strings, generating infinite sustain in voicings ranging from a single note to a full chord. The device was originally conceived as a cost-saving measure for 10cc. The group already owned and operated their own studio, and all four were talented singers and multi-instrumentalists who could also produce and engineer their own records, so their plan was that by using Gizmo-fitted electric guitars, with additional studio processing and overdubbing, they could create an almost infinite variety of sonic effects and orchestral textures "in-house", saving them the considerable expense of hiring session players to add these textures using traditional instruments.

After recording a demonstration single using the Gizmo, their label (Mercury Records) allowed them to continue the project, and over the next year it expanded into a sprawling 3-LP concept album Consequences (1977) with an environmental theme. It contained vocals by Sarah Vaughan and an extended comedy performance by Peter Cook, and was issued in a lavish boxed set package with an accompanying booklet. According to the album's liner notes, the duo's original plan was to hire an all-star cast of comedians (including Peter Ustinov) to perform the album's spoken-word components, but this was soon abandoned, partly due to the cost and logistical difficulty, but also because they quickly realised after meeting Peter Cook that he was able to perform all of the major roles himself. Unfortunately, by the time Consequences was finally released in late 1977, punk was in full swing, and the album was savaged by critics.

In a 1997 interview, Godley expressed regret that he and Creme had left 10cc, saying:

Creme also found the breakup painful, particularly as he and guitarist Eric Stewart are married to a pair of sisters, which made the decision more personal than professional.

The duo gradually regained critical favour with a trio of innovative albums in the late 1970s and early 1980s – L (1978), Freeze Frame  (1979) and Ismism (1981, released as Snack Attack in the United States).

Freeze Frame (1979) included several songs that gained airplay on alternative radio in many countries, notably "I Pity Inanimate Objects" and "An Englishman in New York", which was accompanied by an innovative music video. Several notable guest performers contributed to the album: Roxy Music guitarist Phil Manzanera played guitar on and co-produced the album tracks "Random Brainwave" and "Clues", Paul McCartney contributed backing vocals to the song "Get Well Soon" and Roxy Music saxophonist Andy Mackay played saxophone on the single-only track "Wide Boy" and also appeared in the song's innovative promotional video. Alongside the album tracks released as singles, the duo also released two singles (both of which failed to chart) that contained tracks not included on the LP - "Wide Boy" b/w "I Pity Inanimate Objects" (March 1980) and the instrumental single "Submarine" b/w "Marciano" (September 1980).

They made the UK Top Ten with the singles "Under Your Thumb" (a song about the ghost of a suicidal woman who returns to haunt a rail commuter) (No. 3) and "Wedding Bells" (No. 7) in 1981, both from Ismism (1981). The single "Snack Attack" was also a minor hit. Their 1972 pre-10cc single "The Boys in Blue" (written by Godley, Creme, Gouldman and included in the album Strawberry Bubblegum: A Collection of Pre-10CC Strawberry Studio Recordings 1969–1972) was played at most Manchester City football club matches in the 1990s and is still occasionally played there.

In 1983, they released Birds of Prey which took their music in a more electronic direction, using electronic drum machines for the entire album.

Their 1984 single "Golden Boy" was included on 1985's The History Mix Volume 1 album which celebrated 25 years of recording together. The album, co-produced by J. J. Jeczalik of Art of Noise, remixed samples of their previous recordings to a disco beat. This album also contained the single "Cry" which, helped in part by the video, became their biggest US hit, reaching No. 16. The song reached No. 19 in the UK. A video cassette was also released with visual imagery to complement the music.

Godley & Creme released their final album, Goodbye Blue Sky, in 1988. This album abandoned electronic instruments and used harmonicas, organs, and guitars to tell the story of the earth on the brink of nuclear war. The pair ended their working relationship soon after the release of the album, In a 1997 interview, Creme explained:

In the early 1990s, Godley and Creme were approached by Polydor Records executives about recording a reunion album with 10cc. However, according to Godley, the duo's contributions to the album, ...Meanwhile, were minimal. Studio musicians dominated the recording, and while Godley contributed a lead vocal on the song "The Stars Didn't Show", they rarely saw Stewart and Gouldman. The album was a commercial failure, and Godley and Creme went their separate ways once again.

Freeze Frame, Ismism and Birds of Prey were subsequently reissued on CD, with addition of bonus tracks that had previously only been available on singles:
 Freeze Frame... Plus included four 1980 tracks that were originally only released on singles: "Silent Running" (the B-side of "An Englishman in New York"), "Wide Boy", and the instrumentals "Submarine" and "Marciano".
 Ismism... Plus included the single B-sides "The Power Behind the Throne", "Babies" and "Strange Apparatus" (a shortened edit of "An Englishman in New York").
 Birds of Prey... Plus included the single tracks "Welcome to Breakfast Television", "Samson (Dance Mix)" and "Golden Boy".

Video direction career 
Godley and Creme achieved their greatest success as the innovative directors of more than fifty music videos in the early 1980s. They created memorable videos for Status Quo ("Something 'bout You Baby I Like"), The Police ("Every Breath You Take", "Synchronicity II", "Wrapped Around Your Finger"), Culture Club ("Victims"), Duran Duran ("Girls on Film", "A View to a Kill"), Herbie Hancock ("Rockit"), Go West ("We Close Our Eyes"), Peter Gabriel and Kate Bush ("Don't Give Up"), Frankie Goes to Hollywood ("Two Tribes", "The Power of Love"), Sting ("If You Love Somebody Set Them Free", "Fields of Gold"), Toyah ("Thunder in the Mountains"), Visage ("Fade to Grey"), George Harrison ("When We Was Fab"), Lou Reed ("No Money Down"), Wang Chung ("Everybody Have Fun Tonight"), and Yes ("Leave It"), among many others, up to Godley's video for The Beatles' 1996 single, "Real Love", from the Beatles Anthology.

The pair's innovation extended to their videos for their own songs, notably "Wide Boy" and "Cry". The latter's 1985 video consisted of faces blending into one other using analog cross-fading, anticipating the digital effect of morphing, later used in a similar way in Michael Jackson's 1991 video, "Black or White". This was hailed as "groundbreaking", though it was not without antecedents; a 10-second portion of the promotional video for King Crimson's single "Heartbeat" had used a somewhat similar effect three years earlier.

Today 
Creme joined the avant-garde synth-pop group Art of Noise in 1998. Godley continued to direct music videos. In 2006, he once again teamed up with Gouldman, as they released six new tracks under the name GG06.

Personnel

Members 

 Kevin Godley – drums, percussion, keyboards, programming, vocals
 Lol Creme – keyboards, synthesizers, guitars, bass, percussion, vocals

Session contributors 
 Andy Mackay – saxophones (1978)
 Paul Gambaccini – voices (1978)
 Jonathan Handelsman – saxophones (1978)
 Phil Manzanera – guitars (1979)
 Paul McCartney – backing vocals (1979)
 Rico Rodriguez – trumpet and tuba (1979)
 Bimbo Acock – saxophone (1980)
 Guy Barker – trumpet (1982)
 Mark Feltham – harmonica (1988)
 Mitt Gamon – harmonica (1988)
 Jimmy Chambers – backing vocals (1988)
 George Chandler – backing vocals (1988)
 Jimmy Helms – backing vocals (1988)

Discography 

The discography of Godley & Creme contains seven studio albums, one of which Consequences (1977), is a triple album and another The History Mix Volume 1 (1985) is a hybrid album that is part studio, remix and compilation album. The duo have released four compilation albums, two of which contained material from their former band 10cc. 16 singles were also released by the partnership, though only five can be deemed commercially successful. Godley and Creme directed a large number of music videos, eight of which were for their group.

Studio albums

Compilation albums

Box sets

Singles

Collaborations

Music videos 
Godley & Creme music videos

 "An Englishman in New York" (1979)
 "Wide Boy" (1980)
 "Wedding Bells" (1981)
 "Save a Mountain for Me" (1983)
 "Golden Boy" (1984)
 "Cry" / "History Mix 1" (1985)
 "A Little Piece of Heaven" (1987)
 "10,000 Angels" (1988)

Partial list of music videos directed by Godley and Creme

References

External links 
 "Mr. Blint's Attic", a site devoted to Consequences album interesting uncut interviews with Kevin Godley and Lol Creme
 VH1 Artist Profile - includes video clip from "Cry" (requires Windows operating system)
 Music Video Database - Godley & Creme videography
 2007 Rock N Roll Universe Kevin Godley Interview
 The 'Consequences 10cc Podcast' dedicated to 10cc and Godley & Creme, with particular focus on their album 'Consequences'
 

English musical duos
English progressive rock groups
English new wave musical groups
English pop rock music groups
Rock music duos
Musical groups established in 1969
Musical groups disestablished in 1969
Musical groups established in 1977
Musical groups disestablished in 1988
10cc
Mercury Records artists
Polydor Records artists